A junior college (sometimes referred to colloquially as a juco, JuCo or JC) is a post-secondary educational institution offering vocational training designed to prepare students for either skilled trades and technical occupations and support roles in professions such as engineering, accountancy, business administration, nursing, medicine, architecture, and criminology, or for additional education at another college with more advanced academic material. Students typically attend junior colleges for one to three years.

By country

Bangladesh 

In Bangladesh, after completing the tenth-grade board exam (Secondary School Certificate), students attend two years of junior college, named intermediate college. After passing the SSC exam, students can apply for their desired colleges, where they study in three groups, namely Science, Humanities and Commerce, for two years. After that, students sit for Higher Secondary Certificate at the end of their second year in intermediate College.

Canada

Quebec

India
In India, most states provide schooling till Class 12th. Telangana, Maharashtra, Odisha, Assam, Karnataka and Andhra Pradesh, Bihar, Uttar Pradesh however, have a system of junior colleges where, after taking the Class 10th  board exams (SSLC, SSC), students have to apply to junior colleges to complete their Class 11th and Class 12th and the 11th and 12th is popularly known as PUC, Intermediate Course and HSC in jr.colleges respectively. Junior colleges are also referred to as Pre-University Colleges and Intermediate Colleges. Junior colleges are frequently co-located with degree colleges.

Japan
In Japan after World War II, junior colleges (短期大学) typically provide two-year courses of study but may also provide a three-year course of study. Students who complete the course of study at a junior college are entitled to an associate degree or diploma. 
In Japan before World War II, 
there were three years of national junior colleges (旧制高校).  
 in Tokyo
 in Sendai
 in Kyoto
 in Kanazawa
in Kumamoto
 in Okayama
 in Kagoshima
 in Nagoya

Netherlands

In the Netherlands, junior college is equivalent to MBO (middle-level applied education). The MBO lasts one to four years, depending on the level. There are 4 levels offered to students:
MBO level 1: Assistant training. It lasts 1 year maximum. It is focused on simple executive tasks. If the student graduates, he/she can apply to MBO level 2. 
MBO level 2: Basic vocational education. The programme lasts 2 to 3 years and is focused on executive tasks.
MBO level 3: The programme lasts 3 to 4 years. Students are taught to achieve their tasks independently.
MBO level 4: Middle Management VET. It lasts 3 to 4 years and prepares for jobs with higher responsibility. It also opens the gates to higher education. 
At all levels, MBO offers 2 possible pathways: a school-based education, where training within a company takes between 20 and 59% of the curriculum, or an apprenticeship education, where this training represents more than 60% of the study time. Both paths lead to the same certification. Students in MBO are mostly between 16 and 35. Students of the "apprenticeship" path are overall older (25+). After MBO (4 years), pupils can enroll in HBO (higher professional education) or enter the job market.

Singapore

In Singapore, a Junior College (JC) is equivalent to a sixth form college in the United Kingdom. After the GCE 'O' level examinations in Secondary 4 or 5, students may apply for admission to either a JC or a polytechnic. The two years spent in a JC culminate in a GCE 'A' level certificate, which is the most common qualification used for university admission.

In the past, secondary schools offered both 'O' and 'A' Levels and students in classes studying for the 'A' Levels were known as the "Pre-University" class. During the 1980s and 1990s, the government began the process of transferring all 'A' Level courses to centralised JCs. At present, students finish their 'O' Levels at a secondary school and may choose to take the 'A' Levels at a JC or as a private candidate.

South Korea

In South Korea, junior colleges (전문대학) typically provide 2-year courses of study but may also provide a 3-year course of study if permitted by presidential decree. Students who complete the course of study at a junior college are entitled to an associate degree or diploma. Junior colleges are also permitted, subject to presidential decree, to offer "advanced major courses" for their students that will lead to a bachelor's degree. Junior colleges in South Korea include Yeungjin College and Jeonbuk Science College.

United Kingdom

United States

In the United States, a junior college is a two-year post-secondary school whose main purpose is to provide academic, vocational and professional education. The highest certificate offered by such schools is usually an associate degree, although junior college students may continue their education at a four-year university or college, transferring some or all of the credits earned at the junior college toward the degree requirements of the four-year school.

The term "junior college" historically referred to all non-bachelor's degree granting post-secondary schools. However, over the last few decades, many public junior colleges, which typically aim to serve a local community, have replaced "junior" with "community" in their names. Thus, most self-identified junior colleges in the United States today are private institutions, although only a small percentage of all two-year institutions are private.

Private junior colleges in the United States reached their peak numbers in the 1940s, and have been declining ever since. In the course of the 20th century, many public and private junior colleges evolved into four-year colleges, in some cases passing through an intermediary period as a four-year junior college; institutions that followed this trajectory include Westminster College in Salt Lake City and Shimer College in Mt. Carmel, Illinois.

Cultural connotations
Junior colleges in the United States have long had to contend with a reputation for low academic standards. The concept can be traced back 100 years to the original public junior college, Joliet Junior College, which was established in a high school as the equivalent of thirteenth and fourteenth grades, to prepare qualified students for the final two years of college. To some extent, this is inherent in the junior college mission of providing practical education to students who for various reasons fall outside the typical profile of a four-year college student (for example, someone who has graduated from high school and spent several years working in a relatively unskilled job). Over the years, such colleges developed a reputation as schools of last resort. According to federal statistics, 42% of public community college freshmen take remedial courses. This does not necessarily affect their future transfer prospects: a junior college graduate with good grades can generally transfer to a four-year school and go on to obtain a full bachelor's degree. There is a growing movement of students who are attending junior colleges to save significant sums of money in the first two years of a four-year education.

Athletics
Certain junior colleges also serve as incubators for college athletes, particularly in basketball and football; in sports parlance, they are often referred to as "Jucos". A talented player who would not meet the academic standards of a major college program may be able to play for two years in junior college, establishing an academic record in the process, and then transfer to a major college. This process has occasionally resulted in scandals, often involving the academics of the student athletes.

Military junior college
In the United States, a military junior college is a military-style junior college that allows cadets to become commissioned officers in the armed forces reserve in two years, instead of the usual four. The students must go on to complete a bachelor's degree before serving as regular officers on active duty.

There are currently four military junior colleges:

 Georgia Military College, Milledgeville, Georgia
 Marion Military Institute, Marion, Alabama
 New Mexico Military Institute, Roswell, New Mexico
 Valley Forge Military Academy and College, Wayne, Pennsylvania

See also
Four-year junior college
Community college
Cooling Out
Prep school
Cram school

References

External links
Where Have All the Private 2-Year Colleges Gone?
The Survival of Private Junior Colleges – US Federal Education Resources Information Center Clearinghouse for Junior Colleges, Los Angeles, California.
college.gov – U.S. Department of Education

 
Types of university or college